William Fordjour (born 26 March 1948) is a Ghanaian middle-distance runner. He competed in the men's 1500 metres at the 1972 Summer Olympics.

References

1948 births
Living people
Athletes (track and field) at the 1972 Summer Olympics
Ghanaian male middle-distance runners
Olympic athletes of Ghana
Place of birth missing (living people)
20th-century Ghanaian people